Haabersti  is a subdistrict in the district of Haabersti, Tallinn, the capital of Estonia. It has a population of 714.

Gallery

References

Subdistricts of Tallinn